Giovanni Poleni (b. Venice, around 1683; d. Padua, Nov., 1761) was a Marquess, physicist, mathematician and antiquarian.

Early life
He was the son of Marquess Jacopo Poleni and studied the classics, philosophy, theology, mathematics, and physics at the School of the Padri Somaschi, Venice.

Career
He was appointed, at the age of twenty-five, professor of astronomy at Padua. In 1715 he was assigned to the chair of physics, and in 1719 he succeeded Nicholas II Bernoulli as professor of mathematics. As an expert in hydraulic engineering he was charged by the Venetian Senate with the care of the waters of lower Lombardy and with the constructions necessary to prevent floods. He was also repeatedly called in to decide cases between sovereigns whose states were bordered by waterways.

Poleni was the first to build a calculator that used a pinwheel design. Made of wood, his calculating clock was built in 1709; he destroyed it after hearing that Antonius Braun had received 10,000 Guldens for dedicating a pinwheel machine of his own design to the emperor Charles VI of Vienna. Poleni described his machine in his Miscellanea in 1709, but it was also described by Jacob Leupold in his Theatrum Machinarum Generale ("The General Theory of Machines") which was published in 1727. In 1729, he also built a tractional device that enabled logarithmic functions to be drawn.

Poleni's observations on the impact of falling weights (similar to Willem 's Gravesande's) led to a controversy with Samuel Clarke and other Newtonians that became a part of the so-called "vis viva dispute" in the history of classical mechanics.

His knowledge of architecture caused Benedict XIV to call him to Rome in 1748 to examine the cupola of St. Peter's, which was rapidly disintegrating.
As part of the structural investigation of the dome he used a correctly loaded hanging chain to determine its funicular shape. He promptly indicated the repairs necessary. He also wrote a number of antiquarian dissertations. In 1710 he was elected a Fellow of the Royal Society, in 1739 the French Academy of Sciences made him a member and later the societies of Berlin and St. Petersburg did the same. The city of Padua elected him as magistrate, and after his death erected his statue by Canova. Venice also honoured him by striking a medal.

He married Orsola Roberti of Bassano della Grappa.

Principal works

 
 
Miscellanea (dissertations on physics), Venice, 1709;
 
 

 
 
 De castellis per quæ derivantur fluviorum latera convergentia, Padua, 1720;
 
 
 
Exercitationes Vitruvianæ Venice, 1739;
 
Il tempio di Diana di Efeso (The Temple of Diana at Ephesus); Venice, 1742.

References

Further reading 

 C. Le Gall, Giovanni Poleni (1683-1761) et l’essor de la technologie maritime au siècle des Lumières, Brepols (Turnhout), 2019, 578 p.
Attribution

. Cites:
ANON, Memorie per la vita del Signor G. P. (Padua, 1762);
FOUCHY, Eloge, Mém. de l'ac. des Sc. hist. (Paris, 1763).

External links
 Biography from MacTutor 
Guide to Giovanni Poleni, Specifications and Drawings of the Poleni Calculating Machine by Joannis Poleni 1927 at the University of Chicago Special Collections Research Center

1683 births
1761 deaths
18th-century Latin-language writers
18th-century Italian male writers
Italian antiquarians
18th-century Italian physicists
Fellows of the Royal Society
Members of the Prussian Academy of Sciences
Members of the French Academy of Sciences
Academic staff of the University of Padua